Ascochyta asparagina is a fungal plant pathogen.  It causes stem blight (also known as Ascochyta blight) of asparagus, causing loss or death of branches.

See also
List of Ascochyta species

References
 Westcott's Plant Disease Handbook, by Cynthia Westcott, Ralph Kenneth Horst

asparagina
Fungal plant pathogens and diseases
Monocot diseases
Fungi described in 1987